Ridgewood was a train station along the Lower Montauk Branch of the Long Island Rail Road, located at Woodhaven Boulevard near 78th Avenue in Glendale, Queens, just east of Glendale Junction, the connecting track between the Montauk Branch and Rockaway Beach Branch. It opened on June 2, 1883 and closed in 1924.

References

Former Long Island Rail Road stations in New York City
Railway stations in the United States opened in 1883
Railway stations closed in 1924
Railway stations in Queens, New York
Glendale, Queens